1,2-Bis(diphenylphosphino)benzene (dppbz) is an organophosphorus compound with the formula C6H4(PPh2)2 (Ph = C6H5).  Classified as a diphosphine ligand, it is a common bidentate ligand in coordination chemistry.  It is a white, air-stable solid.  As a chelating ligand, dppbz is very similar to 1,2-bis(diphenylphosphino)ethylene.

References

Chelating agents
Diphosphines
Phenyl compounds